Don Quickshot of the Rio Grande is a 1923 American silent Western film directed by George E. Marshall and written by George Hively. The film stars Jack Hoxie, Emmett King, Elinor Field, Fred C. Jones, William Steele, and Bob McKenzie. It is based on a 1921 short story of the same name by Stephen Chalmers. The film was released on June 4, 1923, by Universal Pictures.

Cast
 Jack Hoxie as 'Pep' Pepper 
 Emmett King as Jim Hellier 
 Elinor Field as Tulip Hellier
 Fred C. Jones as George Vivian 
 William Steele as Bill Barton 
 Bob McKenzie as Sheriff Littlejohn
 Harry Woods as a Knight 
 Hank Bell and Ben Corbett as Henchman
 Skeeter Bill Robbins as Barfly

Preservation
A copy of Don Quickshot of the Rio Grande is housed at the UCLA Film and Television Archive.

References

External links

 
 
 

1923 films
1923 Western (genre) films
Universal Pictures films
Films directed by George Marshall
American black-and-white films
Silent American Western (genre) films
1920s English-language films
1920s American films